Samuel ben Meïr Heckscher was a German-Jewish scholar, who lived at Altona in the seventeenth and eighteenth centuries. He was the author of a work entitled Ḳinah 'al Serefah, in Hebrew and German, on the great fire which raged at Altona in 1711.

References
 

17th-century German Jews
18th-century German Jews
17th-century German male writers
18th-century German male writers